The Oxford Lieder Festival is a UK-based classical music festival, specialising in the art-song repertoire.

History
The Festival was founded in 2002 by the pianist Sholto Kynoch, and in a short space of time grew to be the United Kingdom's largest art song festival. Oxford Lieder is now a registered charity and in addition to the annual festival which takes place in October, there are regular concerts and masterclasses throughout the year, and a growing programme of educational events. While most events are held in a core set of venues (including Holywell Music Room and the Jacqueline du Pré Music Building), there has been a recent show of concerts outside of central Oxford, England.

Recordings
In 2010, Oxford Lieder made its first recording with Stone Records under the Oxford Lieder Live banner. The disc, released in 2011, was the first in a series that will comprise the first complete recordings of the songs of Hugo Wolf. Seven of a total of eleven discs have now been released. In 2013, Oxford Lieder & Stone Records released a live recording of the complete Canticles of Benjamin Britten and a CD entitled 'Schubert Lieder Year by Year', featuring one song from each year of Schubert's compositional life.

Other activities
Oxford Lieder runs a Young Artist Platform, promoting young singer-pianist duos to music clubs and societies around England, Wales and Scotland. It is part of the Oxford Music Network, and works with local schools during the annual festival.

Performers
Performers who have participated in the festival include:

References

External links
Oxford Lieder website

Music festivals established in 2002
Classical music festivals in England
Music in Oxford
Organisations based in Oxford
Charities based in Oxfordshire
Music festivals in Oxfordshire
Festivals in Oxford
2002 establishments in the United Kingdom